Sloppy seconds (or slops in Australian slang) is a slang phrase for when a man has sexual intercourse with a female or male partner who already has received another man's penis in the relevant orifice and is therefore wet or "sloppy". The phrase "buttered bun" is sometimes used to refer to said orifice. The practice is also referred to as a "wet deck".

The term is used, by extension, to refer to any act of entering into a sexual relationship with a person who had previously been in a sexual relationship with someone else in one's peer group.

In November 2022, South Australian Premier Peter Malinauskas was criticised after using the term in a press conference. He apologised, and said he was not aware that it was a sexual term.

See also 

 Sean Avery
 Creampie (sexual act)
 Snowballing (sexual practice)
 Threesome

References 

Sexual acts